Steven Theodore Mazur (born December 21, 1977) is an American guitarist, best known as the lead guitarist for alternative rock band Our Lady Peace. Mazur replaced original band guitarist Mike Turner in 2002.

Life and career

Early life
Mazur has two sisters and two stepsisters and grew up in Richmond, Michigan, attending Cardinal Mooney Catholic College Preparatory High School in Marine City. He graduated from the Berklee College of Music in 2000. At the commencement ceremony, he performed a solo acoustic guitar version of "Think About It," written by Herb Alpert, Will Calhoun, and Doug Wimbish.

Before joining Our Lady Peace, he was in many different bands including Dragonfly (with Jeff Gutt on vocals), Butter Jackson, Ph (pronounced F), and Gabriel Mann's band. He played on the title track for the video game No One Lives Forever for the PlayStation 2.  He also gave guitar lessons at Southern Thumb Music in Richmond and in Los Angeles.

Our Lady Peace
Mazur attended his first Our Lady Peace concert as a fan on July 10, 2001, at the House of Blues in Los Angeles.

Mazur replaced founding member Mike Turner as guitarist for Our Lady Peace during the recording of the band's fifth album, Gravity. The band sorted through thousands of audition tapes in search of a new guitar player, but in the end selected Mazur, who had been introduced to them through a mutual friend.

Mazur's first appearance on stage with the band was at the video shoot for "Somewhere Out There", followed by his first concert on stage with the band on May 15, 2002, at The Asylum in Dayton, Ohio.

External links 
 Steve Mazur on Myspace
 Spotlight Artist on the Yamaha website

1977 births
Living people
American rock guitarists
American male guitarists
Berklee College of Music alumni
Guitarists from Michigan
People from Richmond, Michigan
People from Port Huron, Michigan
Our Lady Peace members
21st-century American musicians
American rock keyboardists
Alternative rock guitarists
21st-century American guitarists
21st-century American male musicians